Cambser See is a lake in Nordwestmecklenburg, Mecklenburg-Vorpommern, Germany. At an elevation of 30.9 m, its surface area is 2.85 km².

External links 
 

Lakes of Mecklenburg-Western Pomerania